This is a list of adult fiction books that topped The New York Times Fiction Best Seller list in 1965.

Only three titles topped the list in 1965. The most popular was The Source by James Michener, which dominated the second half of the year, even through a three-week newspaper strike. The other two titles were Herzog, by Saul Bellow, which completed a run at the top for more than half a year, begun in October 1964 (29 weeks), and Up the Down Staircase by Bel Kaufman (8 weeks, and another 32 at No. 2, in all spending 65 weeks in the top 10 bestsellers). Coincidentally, both of the latter titles, Herzog and Staircase, are epistolary novels, featuring the extensive use of letters. 

1965
.
1965 in the United States